Daniel Theodore Tieman (November 30, 1940 – October 30, 2012) was an American basketball player, coach, and teacher. 

Tieman graduated from Covington Catholic High School in Kentucky in 1958, then played basketball and baseball at Villa Madonna College, today known as Thomas More University, graduating in 1962. He was the basketball team's MVP in 1960 and 1961, and he appeared in the 1960 NAIA Division I men's basketball tournament. In his college career, he recorded 1,454 points and 319 assists. Tieman was drafted by the Kansas City Steers of the American Basketball League, but was later invited to play with the National Basketball Association's Cincinnati Royals, who were coached by Tieman's college coach, Charlie Wolf. Tieman played in 29 games with the Cincinnati Royals during the 1962–63 NBA season. 

After his playing days, he worked at Covington Catholic as a teacher, basketball coach, and administrator. As a basketball coach, he recorded 314 wins.

Tieman was inducted into the Greater Cincinnati Basketball Hall of Fame. He died in 2012 after struggles with cancer.

References

External links 
 Dan Tieman at Basketball-Reference

1940 births
2012 deaths
American men's basketball coaches
American men's basketball players
Basketball coaches from Kentucky
Basketball players from Kentucky
Cincinnati Royals players
Covington Catholic High School alumni
High school basketball coaches in Kentucky
Sportspeople from Covington, Kentucky
Thomas More Saints men's basketball players
Undrafted National Basketball Association players